Adriano Foglia (born 25 April 1981), is a Brazilian-born Italian futsal player who plays for Corinthians as a Flank.

After beginning his career in Brazil, Foglia spent over a decade playing in Italy.

Foglia received the Futsalplanet.com Best Futsal Player of the World award for 2003.

Honours

Individual 
 Best Futsal Player of the World: 2003

References

External links
Futsalplanet.com

1981 births
Living people
Italian men's futsal players
Marca Futsal players
Brazilian emigrants to Italy